The City Treasurer of Philadelphia is the manager of city funds and investments for the City of Philadelphia, Pennsylvania. The current city Treasurer as of July 2019 is Christian Dunbar.

The duties of the City Treasurer include:
Management of new and outstanding City debt in accordance with the city's Debt Management Policies, maximizing the value received from new financing and minimizing interest and transaction costs.
Management of custodial banking for all City funds by encouraging standards and practices consistent with safeguarding City funds.
Serve as the disbursing agent for payments from the City Treasury by distribution of checks and electronic payments in the most modern, secure, effective, and efficient method.
Maximize amount of cash available for investment after meeting daily cash requirements, thereby providing a source of revenue to support the city's financial commitments.

References

External links 
Office of the City Treasurer website

City and town treasurers in the United States
Government of Philadelphia